Separation of isotopes by laser excitation (SILEX) is a process for isotope separation that is being investigated to produce enriched uranium on an industrial scale using lasers. It was developed in the 1990s and is a variant of molecular laser isotope separation (MLIS). For uranium, it uses a cold molecular beam with UF6 in a carrier gas, in which the 235UF6 is selectively excited by an infrared laser near 16 µm. But in contrast to earlier MLIS techniques developed since the 1970s, it does not dissociate the molecule.

History 
Development of various MLIS variants began already in the 1970s. In most of them, an infrared laser vibrationally excited one of the isotopes such as 235UF6 of gaseous uranium hexafluoride. This requires a wavelength near 16 µm. The excited molecules where then further excited up to dissociation, either again at 16 µm or by a UV laser. The resulting UF5 (enriched in 235U) can then be precipitated as a solid. A variant of MLIS developed later is SILEX, which leaves the molecules intact.

After initial euphoria, LIS of uranium was mostly abandoned during the 1990s. Urenco published in 1992 the reasons for their decision. One reason was that LIS processes seemed to require a number of further developments of uncertain outcome, whereas centrifuges had reached technical maturity around this time. But in Australia the SILEX variant was not discontinued.

The SILEX process was developed by Michael Goldsworthy and Horst Struve, working at Silex Systems Limited, a company founded in 1988. In 1993, a set of principles for the separation of isotopes by laser excitation to enrich uranium were established by them at SILEX headquarters in Sydney.

In November 1996, Silex Systems Limited licensed its technology exclusively to United States Enrichment Corporation (USEC) for uranium enrichment.

In 1999, the United States signed the Agreement for Cooperation between the Government of Australia and the Government of the United States of America concerning Technology for the Separation of Isotopes of Uranium by Laser Excitation [SILEX Agreement], which allowed cooperative research and development between the two countries on the SILEX process.

Silex Systems concluded the second stage of testing in 2005 and began its Test Loop Program. Already before, in 2003, USEC backed out from the project. In 2007, Silex Systems signed an exclusive commercialization and licensing agreement with General Electric Corporation (GE). The Test Loop Program was transferred to GE's facility in Wilmington, North Carolina. Also in 2007, GE Hitachi Nuclear Energy (GEH) signed letters of intent for uranium enrichment services with Exelon and Entergy - the two largest nuclear power utilities in the USA.

In 2008, GEH spun off Global Laser Enrichment (GLE) to commercialise the SILEX Technology and announced the first potential commercial uranium enrichment facility using the Silex process. The U.S. Nuclear Regulatory Commission (NRC) approved a license amendment allowing GLE to operate the Test Loop. Also in 2008, Cameco Corporation, Canada, the world's largest uranium producer, joined GE and Hitachi as a part owner of GLE.

In 2010, concerns were raised that the SILEX process poses a threat to global nuclear security (see Proliferation concerns).

In August 2011, GLE applied to the NRC for a permit to build a commercial plant at Wilmington, which would enrich uranium to a maximum of 8% 235U. On September 19, 2012, the NRC made its initial decision on GLE's application, and granted the  requested permit. Silex completed its phase 1 test loop program at GE-Hitachi Global Laser Enrichment's (GLE) facility in Wilmington. The commercial plant's target enrichment level is 8 percent, which puts it on the upper end of low-enriched uranium.

In 2014, both GLE and Silex Systems restructured, with Silex halving its workforce. In 2016 GEH withdrew from GLE, writing-off their investment.

In 2016, the United States Department of Energy agreed to sell about 300,000 tonnes of depleted uranium hexafluoride to GLE for re-enrichment (from 0.35 to 0.7 % 235U) using the SILEX process over 40 years at a proposed Paducah, Kentucky Laser Enrichment Facility.

In 2018, Silex Systems abandoned its plans for GLE, intending to repatriate the SILEX technology to Australia.

In 2021, Silex Systems took majority ownership (51%) of GLE, with Cameco (49%) as minority owner.  The path to market for the venture is underpinned by an agreement between GLE and the US Department of Energy under which DOE uranium tailings will be made available for the proposed Paducah Laser Enrichment project. Silex's technology will be used to produce natural grade uranium from the tailings. GLE intends now (from 2022) to focus on re-enrichment in Paducah. It is on the site, where the last diffusion plant for uranium enrichment worked until 2013. It left behind several hundred thousand tons of depleted UF6.

Process

GLE did not reveal many details about the process (compilation in ). But experts in the field now agree that it involves selective suppression of condensation by laser excitation. It is described here with the example of UF6.

The shortest-wavelength fundamental vibration of gaseous UF6 is around 16 µm. At room temperature its width (around 20 cm−1) is much larger than the isotopic shift (0.6 cm−1). The broadening is due to thermally populated excited vibrational and rotational states. To allow for selective excitation, the UF6, diluted about 100fold by a carrier gas (which can be argon or nitrogen), is cooled to about 80 K by adiabatic expansion through a nozzle into vacuum. Initially there are still collisions (which are necessary for cooling). But after traveling about 10 nozzle diameters, due to the expansion, they are so rare that condensation cannot anymore take place. Avoiding collisions is also necessary to suppress any collisional transfer of energy between the isotopes. Such a molecular beam method is used in all cases, where spectral narrowing is needed for selective excitation.

With SILEX, the pressure and nozzle diameter are chosen large enough to provide a sufficient number of collisions immediately after the nozzle, to allow for formation of clusters (UF6•G) with the carrier gas G. (UF6•UF6 clusters are practically not formed due to the much lower density of UF6 compared to G.) If 235UF6 is selectively excited at 628.3 cm−1, then this molecule does not aggregate with G, wheres the nonexcited heavier 238UF6 does. Due to their higher thermal velocity,  the free molecules leave the axis of the molecular beam faster than the clusters. The latter are therefore enriched in the part transmitted by a skimmer nozzle downstream, whereas the non-transmitted fraction is enriched in the 235UF6. The enrichment factor is the better, the larger the transmitted fraction (i.e. the smaller the depletion and the smaller the cut). That is, SILEX uses a separation nozzle, modified by a laser and profiting from selective repression of cluster formation ("condensation").

Concerning the laser, GLE says (see ) that they use a pulsed CO2 laser, which is shifted by stimulated rotational Raman effect in (cooled) para-hydrogen to 16 µm. For that, the CO2 laser needs at least 20 MW. With a Raman shift of 354.3 cm−1 and a CO2 laser wavenumber of 982.1 cm−1 (10R30 line), one receives 627.8 cm−1. This is only close to the Q-branch of 235UF6 (center at 628.3 cm−1, width 0.01 cm−1 ) and is even closer to the Q-branch of 238UF6. GLE does not inform, how they do the necessary fine tuning. Fuß supposes that a high-pressure CO2 laser is used together with a usual atmospheric-pressure CO2 laser (as apparently in the preliminary setup, although John Lyman supposes that also nondisclosed nonlinear optical tricks will be used.) High-pressure CO2 lasers would cause additional problems with the pulse repetition rate. With common (atmospheric-pressure) CO2 lasers and with the stimulated Raman shifter the state of technology is 2–4 kHz. In order not to leave large parts of the molecular beam unirradiated, one needs at least 20 kHz (according to Urenco several tens of kHz), unless pulsed nozzles are used. The nozzles themselves must have slit form, in order to provide enough absorption length.

GLE informs that they reach separation factors of 2–20, the higher values probably coupled to a poorer depletion (which is not given). This is sufficient for enrichment from natural uranium (0,72 % 235U) to reactor grade (> 3% 235U). The Makarov group demonstrated such high separation factors with other molecules (SF6, CF3Br).  The pioneer works of the van den Bergh group obtained only much smaller enrichments with SF6.

Using other lasers with suitable wavelengths, SILEX can also be used for the isotopic enrichment of other elements such as chlorine, molybdenum,  carbon and silicon.

Proliferation concerns 
Compared to current enrichment technologies, SILEX obtains a higher enrichment. Hence fewer stages are necessary to reach bomb grade uranium (> 90% 235U). According to GLE, each stage requires as little as 25% of the space of the conventional methods. Hence it would facilitate to rogue governments to hide a production facility for bomb uranium. The attractiveness is even enhanced by the claims of GLE that a SILEX plant is faster and cheaper to build, and consumes considerably less energy. Scientists therefore expressed their concerns repeatedly that SILEX could create an easy path towards a nuclear weapon (see e.g.). The model calculations of Ryan Snyder substantiate these warnings.

On the other hand, Werner Fuß compared the claimed performance of Silex with existing centrifuge plants, with the result that the area needed, the build-up time and the costs are similar, or at least the differences were exaggerated by GLE. But he also noted that centrifuges do present a proliferation danger.

Compared to economic aspects, it is more interesting for potential violators of the non-proliferation treaty, how easy an enrichment plant is to hide (which is similar for Silex and centrifuges), how easily the technology is accessed and how much development is still to do. For the latter two questions, the answer of Urenco may also apply, namely that the centrifuges are technologically mature, whereas laser processes still need further development.

Security classification

SILEX is the only privately held information that is classified by the U.S. government. In June 2001, the U.S. Department of Energy classified "certain privately generated information concerning an innovative isotope separation process for enriching uranium". Under the Atomic Energy Act, all information not specifically declassified is classified as Restricted Data, whether it is privately or publicly held. This is in marked distinction to the national security classification executive order, which states that classification can only be assigned to information "owned by, produced by or for, or is under the control of the United States Government". This is the only known case of the Atomic Energy Act being used in such a manner.

Popular culture
The 2014 Australian Broadcasting Corporation drama The Code uses "Laser Uranium Enrichment" as a core plot device. The female protagonist Sophie Walsh states that the technology will be smaller, less energy-intensive, and more difficult to control once it is a viable alternative to current methods of enrichment. Ms. Walsh also states that the development of the technology has been protracted, and that there are significant governmental interests in maintaining the secrecy and classified status of the technology.

See also
Atomic vapor laser isotope separation
Molecular laser isotope separation

References

External links
 

Isotope separation